Renault Sport  or Renaultsport, was the motorsport, performance and special vehicles division for Renault-badged cars and is now a sub-badge of Renault cars managed by Alpine. Renault Sport was officially established in 1976 as a merger between the Alpine and Gordini competition departments. It was reorganised in 2002 and 2016. In December 2021, all Renault Sport operations were merged into an Alpine-led business unit. The Renault Sport car range under Alpine is set to be almost completely phased out by the end of 2023.

History

Renault Sport was created at the end of 1976, when Renault closed down the Alpine competition department (at that time, its main motorsport division), located at Dieppe, and moved all the racing activities to the Gordini factory at Viry-Châtillon, just outside Paris. The Dieppe-based Alpine department specialised in the construction of race car chassis while the Viry-Châtillon-based Gordini focussed on engines. However, several conflicts emerged between them, and Renault took the decision to unify both departments into a single location in order to achieve a greater integration and harmony. The company concentrated principally on developing a car for Formula One, although it also participated in other series.

In 2002, the Viry-Châtillon factory became the engine department of the Renault F1 team and Renault Sport was moved to Les Ulis and renamed Renault Sport Technologies (RST).

On 3 February 2016, Renault announced a reorganisation of its racing and performance activities. The Formula One operation and RST's former motorsport branch were put under the new Renault Sport Racing division. RST's former roadcar branch at Les Ulis became the Renault Sport Cars division.

In January 2021, the Alpine company announced it would absorb both Renault Sport Racing and Renault Sport Cars to form an Alpine business unit. The Renault Sport range, under Alpine, is slowly being phased out. The final new Renault Sport-badged car, the Megane Renault Sport Ultime (a variant of the fourth-generation Megane model) introduced in early 2023, is set to cease production in late 2023.

Rallying
Gordini-tuned Renault cars won many rallies during the 1950s and 1960s, and Alpine, being a subsidiary of Renault, won the first World Rally Championship (WRC) in 1973. In the WRC, Renault had some success with cars such as the R5 Turbo and the R17 Gordini until it left international rallying in late 1994 (although it continued competing in national and promotional rally series).

The European Rally Championship was won three times by a Renault car (1999, 2004, 2005).

On 21 February 2013, Renault Sport Technologies announced its official return to international rallying in the European Rally Championship.

Renault's WRC summary

† Without Renault Sport assistance.

JWRC

Off-roading
In 1979, the Marreau brothers finished in second place in the cars category at the Rally Dakar driving a Sinpar-prepared 4L  4x4. They won the 1982 edition with a Renault Sport backed Renault 20 Turbo 4x4. Later, Renault Sport powered and sponsored the Schlesser-Renault Elf buggies which won the 1999 and 2000 editions. The 1999 car was the first two-wheel drive Dakar winner.

Formula E

Renault was one of the first car manufacturers involved in the Formula E (FE) championship. For the inaugural season, Renault Sport became a technical partner of the series, also agreeing a title sponsorship deal with the e.dams team which achieved the first FE teams' championship. Before the 2015–16 season, following the introduction of new rules allowing the development of the electric powertrains used in the FE's Spark chassis, Renault announced it would entry as a supplier for e.dams. The new powertrain manufactured by Renault Sport was named Renault ZE 15. For the 2016–17 season, Renault added the Chinese team Techeetah as a powertrain client. In October 2017, Renault Sport Racing announced it would withdraw from FE at the end of the 2017–18 season.

Results of Renault Sport as a powertrain supplier
(key) (results in bold indicate pole position, results in italics indicate fastest lap)

Formula One

From 1977 to 1986 and again between 1989 and 1997, Renault Sport was in charge of Renault's Formula One programme. Renault Sport F1, created at the end of 2010 and active until 2015, was a subsequent incarnation of Renault's involvement in Formula One and was headquartered in Viry-Châtillon, which functioned as a semi-independent operation. In 2016, the Formula One operation became part of Renault Sport Racing. In September 2020, the Renault company said it would repurpose the F1 team to promote Alpine.

Formula Two
Alpine constructed various chassis and prepared engines for Formula Two (F2). In 1973, Renault-Gordini (later Renault Sport) introduced a two-litre V6 engine for F2, the CH, which was the basis of its future Le Mans and F1 engines. Jean-Pierre Jabouille and René Arnoux won the 1976 and 1977 European Formula Two Championships with Renault-powered cars.

Results of Renault Sport as an engine supplier

1976
(key) (Races in bold indicate pole position; races in italics indicate fastest lap)

1977
(key) (Races in bold indicate pole position; races in italics indicate fastest lap)

Note: During this season Scuderia Everest also entered Renault-powered cars, although those were not supplied by Renault Sport.

Formula Three
Gordini and Alpine-tuned Renault engines were used in various Formula Three (F3) series since  the 1960s.  Alpine (a partially owned subsidiary of Renault since 1973) also developed cars for the category. In 1979, Alain Prost won the FIA European Formula Three Championship with a Renault engine prepared by Oreca. The last victory of a Renault engine before its withdrawal from the formula at the end of 2003 was in the 2003 Macau Grand Prix with a Sodemo-tuned unit from a Signature Team's Dallara car driven by Nicolas Lapierre.

Renault Sport Technologies announced its return to F3 as an engine supplier with Oreca again as engine tuner for the 2014 FIA European Formula Three Championship. However, this was indefinitely halted because of the lack of power of the Oreca-tuned engine compared to rivals.

Sportscars

Renault Sport was responsible for Renault's sports car racing entries during the 1970s, including their win at the 1978 24 Hours of Le Mans race with the Renault Alpine A442.

Touring cars
Capitalising on the growing reputation and success of the Super Touring regulations introduced in the early 1990s, Renault made the decision to enter the British Touring Car Championship in 1993 with reigning champion Tim Harvey and Alain Menu signed as their drivers. Renault's first BTCC effort was based on the Renault 19 chassis, initially developed by test driver Jean Ragnotti. Success was almost immediate as Harvey and Menu scored a win each in 1993, before the 19 was replaced with the new Renault Laguna for 1994. The Laguna lent itself as a more competitive proposition than its predecessor and went on to be a highly successful car throughout its racing life, the highlight being in 1997 when Alain Menu took 12 victories on his way to the championship.

Hillclimbing
In 2011, a Dacia Duster car prepared for Renault Sport Technologies, Sodemo and Tork Engineering and fitted with a Nissan GT-R engine participated at the Pike's Peak hillclimbing.

Car manufacturing

In 1994, Renault discontinued the Alpine marque, badging since then its sport cars manufactured at the Dieppe factory as Renault Sport. The production of Renault Sport cars for the mainstream markets at Dieppe ended in 2018. Renault Sport models are also produced at Renault Spain's Palencia factory (Mégane Renault Sport).

Current models
 Clio GT/RS Line (2013–present)
 Megane GT/RS Line (2010–present)
 Megane Renault Sport (2004–present)
 Arkana RS Line (2021–present)
 Captur RS Line (2021–present)

Former models
 Clio Renault Sport (1998–2018)
 Twingo GT (2016–2019)
 Twingo Renault Sport (2011–2013)
 Sandero RS (2015–2021; only South America)

Divisions
Renault Sport is in charge of the conception and manufacturing of the Gordini-badged sport cars and also of modifying cars and vans for special purposes (transporting people with reduced mobility, driving school cars, business fleets) through its division Renault Tech.

Sites
Les Ulis (car development, management)
Viry-Châtillon (racing car development, marketing)

Activities
Manufacturer of limited edition sport and special purpose models 
Competitor in motorsport events, for example:
Rallying
Organisation of single-model vehicle championships
Organiser or/and sponsor of the Formula Renault national and international championships
Organiser of the Renault Sport Series on circuits
Former shareholder in SMA Engines; an aircraft engine manufacturer, an alliance of RST, EADS and SAFRAN

Championships
Renault Sport organises several national and international one-make racing championships.
 Formula Renault 2.0L and 1.6L
 Renault Clio Cup 
 Dacia Logan Cup

International

Many international subsidiaries of Renault have their own Renault Sport division, including Renault UK, Renault Argentina, Renault Spain and Renault Italy,  among others.

Renault in motorsport 
Renault is also involved in other racing series but not as Renault Sport.
Renault Clio
 French Super Production Championship
 Belgian Procar Championship
 BTCC with Renault Laguna Williams
 Endurance Touring Car Series
Renault Mégane/Renault Fluence
 TC2000 Argentina (1984–2011, currently the participation is in charge of the local Renault Sport branch).
Renault Spider:
 Spanish GT Championship (1999?–2000?)
Renault 8 Gordini:
 Springbok Series (1966–1971)
Renault 4CV
24 hours of Le Mans (1949–1954)
Renault Alpine A110: In 1971 Alpine achieved a 1–2–3 finish in the Monte Carlo rally, using cars with engines derived from the Renault 16. In 1973, they repeated the 1–2–3 Monte Carlo result and went on to win the World Rally championship outright.

References

External links

 V6 Clio owners club
 Clio 16v owners club
 Renault Sport Italia
 Renaultsport Megane range site
 ClioSport owners club
 Clio197 owners club

 
Companies based in Paris-Saclay
Official motorsports and performance division of automakers
24 Hours of Le Mans teams
French auto racing teams
Super GT teams
French racecar constructors
Intercontinental Rally Challenge teams
European Rally Championship teams
British Touring Car Championship teams
World Rally Championship teams